Mawei railway station is a railway station located in the Mawei District of Fuzhou, Fujian Province, China, on the Fuzhou-Mawei railway operated by the Nanchang Railway Bureau, China Railway Corporation.

References 

Railway stations in Fujian